The Lydecker Hilltop House is an Art Deco house and film location in Los Angeles, California designed by Howard and Theodore Lydecker. It was designated a Los Angeles Historic-Cultural Monument by the City of Los Angeles on May 14, 2008.

References

External links
 Lydecker House Official Website & Photographs
Art Deco Society of Los Angeles – August 2: Lecture-The Lydeckers-Special Effects Pioneers & Streamline Architecture

Houses in Los Angeles
Buildings and structures in the San Fernando Valley
Los Angeles Historic-Cultural Monuments
Streamline Moderne architecture in California